The Annual Review of Vision Science is an academic journal published by Annual Reviews. In publication since 2015, this journal covers significant developments in the field of vision science with an annual volume of review articles. It is edited by David H. Brainard, John H. R. Maunsell, and J. Anthony Movshon. As of 2022, Journal Citation Reports gives the journal  a 2021 impact factor of 7.745.

History
The Annual Review of Vision Science was first published in 2015 by Annual Reviews. Its founding editors were J. Anthony Movshon and Brian Wandell. In 2021, Wandell was succeeded by David H. Brainard and John H. R. Maunsell. Though it began with a physical edition, it is now only published electronically.

Scope and indexing 
The Annual Review of Vision Science is multidisciplinary, including aspects of neuroscience, genetics, computer science, cell biology, and medicine. Reviews may cover optics, retina, visual perception, eye movement, visual processing, visual development, vision models, computer vision, and the mechanisms and treatments of diseases that affect vision. As of 2022, Journal Citation Reports lists the journal's 2021 impact factor as 7.745, ranking it fourth of 61 journal titles in the category "Ophthalmology" and 34th of 274 titles in "Neurosciences". It is abstracted and indexed in Scopus, Science Citation Index Expanded, and BIOSIS Previews, among others.

Editorial processes
The Annual Review of Vision Science is helmed by the editor or the co-editors. The editor is assisted by the editorial committee, which includes associate editors, regular members, and occasionally guest editors. Guest members participate at the invitation of the editor, and serve terms of one year. All other members of the editorial committee are appointed by the Annual Reviews board of directors and serve five-year terms. The editorial committee determines which topics should be included in each volume and solicits reviews from qualified authors. Unsolicited manuscripts are not accepted. Peer review of accepted manuscripts is undertaken by the editorial committee.

Current editorial board
As of 2022, the editorial committee consists of the three co-editors and the following members:

 Marlene Behrmann
 T. Rowan Candy
 Hany Farid
 Marla Feller
 Richard J. Krauzlis
 Tirin Moore
 Cynthia Owsley
 Russell N. Van Gelder
 Janey L. Wiggs
 Rachel O. Wong

References 

 

Vision Science
Annual journals
Publications established in 2015
English-language journals
Perception journals
Ophthalmology journals